Barbara Elaine Gunter Coffman (born June 19, 1942 in San Diego, California) is an American writer of both historical romance and suspense, writing as Elaine Coffman.

Biography
Elaine Coffman is a New York Times bestselling author who has published in both the historical romance and suspense genres. Her novels take place in Scotland, Regency England, Italy and the American West. She is the author of nineteen novels and five novellas.

Personal
Barbara Elaine Gunter was born in San Diego, California, to William Samuel Gunter, Jr., a naval officer and Edna Marie (née Davidson) Gunter, a homemaker.  From the age of three. she lived in Midland, Texas and graduated from Midland High School.  Gunter received a degree in elementary education from North Texas State University.  She taught elementary school in Midland, Texas, while working on her Master's Degree and certification for Language and Learning Disabilities at Texas Tech in Lubbock.

Writing
Coffman's  romances have been noted for their historical research; Publishers Weekly said, in the review for The Italian, "Coffman renders Italy's plight with the exactitude of a historian."

Coffman's first suspense novel, Alone in the Dark, was published by Pocket Books in 2006.

Awards and honours
Three of Coffman's books have been nominated for Best Historical Romance of the Year by Romance Writers of America. She has also received the Maggie Award, Reviewers Choice Award, and Best Western Historical Award. If You Loved Me, the last book of Coffman's Mackinnon series, was her first book to hit the New York Times bestseller list.

Bibliography

Single novels
My Enemy, My Love, 1988, reissue 1991
If My Love Could Hold You, 1989, Dell; Fawcett reissue, 1998
For All The Right Reasons, 1991, Dell; Fawcett reissue
Somewhere Along The Way, 1992, Dell
So This Is Love, 1993, Fawcett reissue
Heaven Knows, 1994, Fawcett Books
A Time For Roses, 1995, Fawcett Books
When Love Comes Along, 1995, Warner Books
If You Love Me, 1997, Fawcett Books
Someone Like You, 1997, Fawcett Books
The Bride of Black Douglas, 2000, MIRA
The Fifth Daughter, 2001, MIRA
The Italian, 2002, MIRA
The Highlander, 2003, MIRA
Let Me Be Your Hero, 2004, MIRA
By Fire and By Sword, 2005, MIRA
Alone in the Dark, 2006, Pocket Books.

MacKinnon Brothers Series
Angel in Marble, 1991, 1998
For All The Right Reasons, 1991
Somewhere Along The Way, 1992
So This Is Love, 1993, Fawcett Books
Heaven Knows, 1994, Fawcett Books
When Love Comes Along, 1995, Warner Books
If You Love Me, 1997, Fawcett Books.

The Italian Chronicles Series
The Fifth Daughter, 2001
The Italian, 2002.

The Graham-Lenox Family Saga
The Highlander, 2003
Let Me Be Your Hero, 2004
By Fire and By Sword, 2006.

Anthologies
The Bride of the Black Scot, From the Anthology: To Have and to Hold, 1994, Avon Books
A Ribbon of Moonlight, From the Anthology, Midsummer Nights Madness, 1995, St. Martin's Press
The Bride of Blackness Castle, From the Anthology: 1996, Outlaw Brides, Harlequin; The Bride of Blackness Castle, Reprint Anthology, 2002, A Gentleman of Substance
Playing With Fire, From the Anthology: Seeing Fireworks, 1997 St. Martin's Press
Under The Mistletoe, From the Anthology: ‘Tis The Season, 1997, Zebra Under The Mistletoe, Reprint Anthology, Santa Baby, 2002, Zebra.

References

External links
Official Website
Elaine Coffman at Fantastic Fiction
The Bride of Black Douglas website

1942 births
Living people
American romantic fiction writers
American women novelists
Writers from San Diego
Women romantic fiction writers
21st-century American women